Echourouk + and sometimes written Echorouk Plus formerly CBC Benna TV was an Algerian basic cable and satellite television channel owned by Echourouk Group, The channel aired both specials and regular talk shows and youth programmes.

History 
Benna TV was founded on March 19, 2015; it changed its name to CBC Benna in 2017 but continued to specialize in cooks and food. It changed completely to Echorouk + when its programming became oriented towards youth.

Programs 
This is a list of programs broadcast by Echorouk+ :

Other shows 
 Kara Sevda
 Diriliş: Ertuğrul
 Yu Gi Oh
 The Adventures of Tintin

References

External links 
 

Arab mass media
Television in Algeria
Arabic-language television stations
Arabic-language television
 
Television channels and stations established in 2015
Television stations in Algeria
Mass media in Algiers